Crash Boat Beach or Crashboat Beach on the northwestern coast of Puerto Rico is situated in the municipality of Aguadilla.

Description
Crash Boat Beach is halfway between the former Ramey Air Force Base (today's Aguadilla Airport) and Aguadilla and still retains some remains of its pier infrastructure from when it was used to support Ramey Air Force Base. Now these piers remains are used as a fishing and recreation spot. 

The Crash Boat Beach piers / dock was originally built for use by the United States military rescue boats who raced out to sea to rescue downed airmen from Ramey Air Force Base, hence the name "Crash boat". As time passed, the local sea currents deposited tons of sand into the pier area forming into a beach, making it unusable to dock boats at the pier.

Crash Boat Beach is now a tourism spot where vacationers participate in recreational activities, such as swimming, sun bathing, surfing, and snorkeling.

Gallery

See also

Flamenco Beach
La Pocita de Isabela
List of beaches in Puerto Rico
Puerto Rico Tourism Company

References

External links 
Descubra Puerto Rico More Crash Boat Pictures

Aguadilla, Puerto Rico
Beaches of Puerto Rico
Surfing locations in Puerto Rico